Jeow Bong or Jaew Bong also called Luang Prabang chili sauce is a sweet and savory Lao chili paste originating from Luang Prabang, Laos. Jeow Bong is made with sundried chilies, galangal, garlic, fish sauce and other ingredients commonly found in Laos. Its distinguishing ingredient, however, is the addition of shredded water buffalo or pork skin.

It is eaten usually by dipping Lao sticky rice or a raw/parboiled vegetable in it. It's also a condiment for a Lao riverweed snack called Kaipen. Jeow bong lasts for a long time, does not spoil easily and can be either on the spicier or sweeter side, depending who makes it. Characteristically, it is both sweet and spicy.

Gallery

See also

 Nam phrik phao
 Chili pepper paste

References

Chili paste
Lao cuisine